InCrest is a Danish alternative rock band formed in 2003 in Copenhagen, Denmark. The band consists of founding vocalist and guitarist Sylar, bassist Anders and founding drummer Jonas. The group's debut album Rubicon Atlas was released November 28, 2014, followed by a Danish tour and Indian Tour.
The first single Nightcrawler from the group's sequel album came out early on August 1, 2018. The full second studio album entitled The Ladder The Climb The Fall was released September 15, 2018.

Discography

Studio albums
 Rubicon Atlas (2014)
 The Ladder The Climb The Fall (2018)

Singles
 Jenna Lynn (2014)
 Even Though (2015)
 Changing Time (2015)
 Nightcrawler (2018)
 Aces (2019)

Music videos
 Jenna Lynn (2014)
 Even Though (2015)
 Changing Time (2015)
 Nightcrawler (2018)
 Aces (2019)

References

External links
  

Danish alternative rock groups